Anna Fredericka Philippine of Schleswig-Holstein-Sonderburg-Wiesenburg (4 July 1665 - 25 February 1748), was a German noblewoman member of the House of Oldenburg and by marriage Duchess of Saxe-Zeitz-Pegau-Neustadt.

Born in Wiesenburg, she was the thirteenth of fifteen children born from the second marriage of Philip Louis, Duke of Schleswig-Holstein-Sonderburg-Wiesenburg with Anna Margaret of Hesse-Homburg. From her fourteen full-siblings, only seven survive adulthood: Frederick, Sophie Elisabeth (by marriage Duchess of Saxe-Zeitz), Charles Louis, Eleanor Margaret (by marriage Princess of Liechtenstein), William Christian, Magdalene Sophie (Abbess in Quedlinburg) and Johanna Magdalene Louise. In addition, she had two further older half-siblings from her father's first marriage with Catharina of Waldeck-Wildungen, of whom only one survive: Dorothea Elisabeth (by her two marriages Countess of Sinzendorf, Rabutin and Marchioness de Fremonville).

Life
In Moritzburg Castle on 27 February 1702, Anna Fredericka Philippine married Frederick Henry, Duke of Saxe-Zeitz-Pegau-Neustadt. They had two children, of whom only one survive adulthood:
Maurice Adolph Charles (Moritzburg, 1 December 1702 - Pöltenberg, 20 June 1759), Duke of Saxe-Zeitz-Pegau-Neustadt (1713–18), Bishop of Hradec Králové (Königrgrätz) (1732) and Litoměřice (Leitmeritz) (1733–52),
Dorothea Charlotte (Moritzburg, 20 May 1708 - Moritzburg, 8 November 1708).

Anna Fredericka Philippine died in Neustadt an der Orla aged 82.

References

|-

1665 births
1748 deaths
House of Oldenburg in Schleswig-Holstein
House of Wettin
Duchesses of Saxe-Zeitz
17th-century German women
18th-century German women